Patty is the given name, a diminutive form of Patricia, or a diminutive form of Patrick in some forms of English (notably Australian).

It may refer to:

People 
 Patty Andrews (1918–2013), American singer of the Andrews Sisters singing trio
 Patricia Patty Berg (1918–2006), American LPGA golfer
 Patty Berg (politician) (born 1942), American politician
 Patty Berg-Burnett, volleyball player and coach
 Patty Yumi Cottrell (born 1981), American writer
 Patty Donahue (1956–1996), American singer
 Patty Duke (1946–2016), American actress
 Patty Fendick (born 1965), American former tennis player and coach
 Patricia Patty Griffin (born 1964), American singer, songwriter and musician
 Patricia Patty Hearst (born 1954), American socialite, kidnap victim and member of the Symbionese Liberation Army
 Patty Hill (1868–1946), American composer and teacher, co-writer of the tune which later became "Happy Birthday to You"
 Patricia Patty Hopkins, (born 1942), British architect
 Patricia Patty Jenkins (born 1971), American film director and screenwriter
 Patty Judge (born 1943), American politician
 Patricia Patty Kempner (born 1942), American retired swimmer, Olympic champion and world record holder
 Patty Kim, Canadian filmmaker
 Patty Kim (politician) (born 1973), American politician
 Patty Lopez, American politician elected to the California State Assembly in 2014
 Patty Loveless (born 1957), American country music singer born Patty Lee Ramey
 Patrick Patty Mills (born 1988), Australian basketballer
 Patricia Patty McCormack (born 1945), American actress
 Patricia Patty Murray (born 1950), senior US senator from Washington
 Patty Pravo (born 1948), Italian singer born Nicoletta Strambelli
 Patty Sahota, Canadian politician in office 2001-2005
 Patty Smyth (born 1957), American singer and songwriter, leader of the rock band Scandal
 Patty Sonnekson (born 1927), American retired pairs figure skater
 Patricia Patty Van Wolvelaere (born 1950), American retired hurdler

Fictional characters 
 Patty and Selma Bouvier, on the television series The Simpsons
 Patricia Patty Halliwell, one of the main characters on the television series Charmed
 Patty Spivot, a DC Comics friend and partner of the second Flash
 Patti Mayonaise, on the Nickelodeon/Disney animated series "Doug"
 Patricia Patty Williams, on the American soap opera The Young and the Restless
 Patty (Peanuts), a character in the comic strip Peanuts (not to be confused with another Peanuts character, Peppermint Patty)
 Patricia Patty Thompson, a character from the anime Soul Eater
 Patty, a recurring character in the Disney Channel TV show The Ghost and Molly McGee
 Patty, a cow villager from the video game series Animal Crossing

See also
Paddy (given name)
Patti (name), given name and surname

Unisex given names
Hypocorisms
English unisex given names
English feminine given names
English masculine given names